The discography of American singer Nancy Wilson includes over sixty albums, and charted singles. Wilson's musical style spans several genres, blues, jazz, soul, R&B, and pop. She is the recipient of three Grammy awards.

Albums

Studio albums

Live albums

Compilation albums

Singles

Other charted songs

References

Notes

External links

Discographies of American artists
Jazz discographies